Vigilante Vigilante: The Battle for Expression is a 2011 documentary film directed by Max Good.  The film profiles several anti-graffiti vigilantes throughout the United States, including Jim Sharp (The Silver Buff), Joe Connolly (The Graffiti Guerrilla), and Fred Radtke (The Grey Ghost).

Festival screenings
New Orleans Film Festival (2011)
New Hampshire Film Festival (2011)
Göteborg International Film Festival (2012)
International Festival of Films on Art (2012)
Victoria Film Festival (2012)
Revelation Perth International Film Festival (2012)
Design Indaba Film Festival (2012)
DOCUTAH Film Festival (2012)

References

External links
 
 
 

2011 films
2011 documentary films
American documentary films
Graffiti in the United States
Documentary films about graffiti
2010s English-language films
2010s American films